Llanquihue Province is one of four provinces of the Chilean region of Los Lagos (X). Its capital is Puerto Montt. Chile's second largest lake, Lake Llanquihue, is located in the province as well as four volcanoes: Osorno, Calbuco, Puntiagudo and Cerro Tronador.

European settlement of Llanquihue began in 1852 when Germans were encouraged to immigrate to southern Chile. A century later in 1945 a new wave of Jewish refugees came from Germany.

The region is well known for the beauty of its natural environment as well as for the food and seafood from the ports of Puerto Montt and Calbuco.

Administration
As a province, Llanquihue is a second-level administrative division of Chile, governed by a municipality for each constituent commune (Spanish: comuna). Puerto Montt is the provincial capital. The provincial governor is Francisco  Le-Bretón as appointed by the President of Chile.

Communes

 Calbuco
 Cochamó
 Fresia
 Frutillar
 Llanquihue
 Los Muermos
 Maullín
 Puerto Montt
 Puerto Varas

Geography and demography
Of these, 232,962 (72.5%) lived in urban areas and 88,531 (27.5%) in rural areas. Between the 1992 and 2002 censuses, the population grew by 22.4% (58,931 persons).

Cities
Frutillar
Puerto Montt
Puerto Varas
Llanquihue
Fresia
Calbuco

References 

 
Provinces of Los Lagos Region
Provinces of Chile